The Women's 10 kilometre classical cross-country skiing competition at the 2006 Winter Olympics in Turin, Italy was held on 16 February, at Pragelato.

The world champion at the 10 kilometre event was Kateřina Neumannová – however, that was in the freestyle event, and a classical-style 10 kilometre in the World Championship had not been held since 1989. In the World Cup, however, there had been two events leading up to the Olympics, both won by Norwegians: Marit Bjørgen won at Kuusamo, Finland in November, and Hilde Gjermundshaug Pedersen at Otepää, Estonia in January. Bente Skari won the Olympic gold in 2002, but did not defend her status, having retired after the 2003 World Championship.

Šmigun won her second gold of the Olympics, winning 21 seconds ahead of Marit Bjørgen, with two other Norwegians following.

In 2014, the Estonian Olympic Committee was notified by the IOC that one of Šmigun's samples from the 2006 Turin Games had been retested with a positive result. On 24 October 2016, the World Anti-Doping Agency Athletes' Commission stated that Šmigun's case will be heard in the Court of Arbitration for Sport by the end of the month. Marit Bjørgen of Norway, winner of the silver medal, would receive the gold medal if Šmigun is stripped of the gold.

Results

Seventy-two skiers entered the race, with all but two completing the course and receiving a rank. Beckie Scott, the 2002 Olympic champion in the pursuit event, was disqualified for skiing outside the marked track, the only such disqualification in the cross-country events in Turin.

References

Women's cross-country skiing at the 2006 Winter Olympics
Women's 10 kilometre cross-country skiing at the Winter Olympics